Commonwealth Engineering (often shortened to Com-Eng, later Comeng [ ]) was an Australian engineering company that designed and built railway locomotives, rolling stock and trams.

History
Smith and Waddington, the predecessor to Commonwealth Engineering, was founded in 1921, in the Sydney suburb of Camperdown, as a body builder for custom motor cars. It went bankrupt in the Depression, and was reformed as Waddingtons Body Works and the main factory was moved to Granville, after a fire in the main workshop. The Government of Australia took control of the company during World War II as the company was in serious financial difficulties but had many government orders in its books. The government purchased a controlling stake in the company in 1946 and changed the name to Commonwealth Engineering.

In 1949 a factory was established in Rocklea, Queensland. This was followed in 1952 a plant in Bassendean, Western Australia and in 1954 by another in Dandenong, Victoria. In June 1957, the government sold its shares. In November 1982 Comeng was taken over by Australian National Industries.

The Granville factory closed in 1989 and has been demolished. The site, which was situated between the Great Western Highway and Main Western railway line west of Duck River, has been replaced with new developments including high-rise housing and light industries.

In 1990, the Dandenong plant was sold to ABB Transportation (later Bombardier Transportation, now Alstom), while the Bassendean facility was sold to A Goninan & Co (now UGL Rail).

John Dunn has written a history of Comeng:
Volume 1, 1921 – 1955, published in 2006
Volume 2, 1955 – 1966, published in 2008
Volume 3, 1967 – 1977, published in 2010
Volume 4, 1977 – 1985, published in 2013
Volume 5, 1985 – 1990, published posthumously in November 2013

Buses

Australian Capital Territory
60 Canberra Bus Service AEC Reliance 470s
30 Canberra Bus Service AEC Swift 505s

New South Wales
50 Leyland OPSU1/1s
50 AEC Regal IVs

Victoria
50 AEC Regal IIIs

Western Australia
Leyland OPSU1/1s

Diesel locomotives 
 XP2009 at Tallarook in November 2011

New South Wales
8 BHP Port Kembla D1 class diesel locomotives
6 442 class diesel locomotives
10 70 class diesel hydraulic locomotives
50 80 class diesel electric locomotives
15 XPT power cars

Queensland
1 Mount Isa Mines 302 class diesel-hydraulic locomotive
 1 Mount Isa Mines 305 class diesel-hydraulic locomotive
 7 DL class locomotives for Innisfail Tramway operations

Western Australia 

1 MRWA E class locomotive
10 WAGR B class locomotives
11 Westrail N class diesel locomotives
Alco 636 M636 diesel locomotives for Hamersley Iron
21 Alco 636 diesel locomotives for Mount Newman Mining
12 Alco 636 diesel locomotives for Robe River Mining

Electric locomotives

New South Wales
10 85 class electric locomotive
50 86 class electric locomotive

Queensland 

 18 3100 class electric locomotive
 68 3200 class electric locomotive

Diesel multiple units

New South Wales
5 1100 class Budd railcars

Queensland
24 1800 class railcars
2 1900 class railcars
40 2000 class railcars

South Australia
30 2000 class Adelaide suburban diesel railcars
20 3000 class Adelaide suburban diesel railcars

Western Australia
10 West Australian ADK diesel multiple units
8 West Australian Prospector diesel railcars
5 West Australian Australind diesel railcars

Tasmania
6 Tasmanian Government Railways DP class railcars

India
Diesel railcars for Indian Railways

Electric multiple units

New South Wales
80 Sputnik Sydney suburban carriages
80 U set Intercity carriages
359 S set Sydney suburban carriages
246 V set Intercity carriages
11 Skitube Alpine Railway electric carriages

Victoria 

570 Comeng Melbourne suburban carriages

Carriages

Commonwealth Railways
24 carbon steel carriages
124 stainless steel carriages

Long Island Rail Road
10 C1 bilevel cars (design only; built by Tokyu Car Corporation)

New South Wales
35 N type carriages
67 RUB carriages
75 stainless steel carriages
47 XPT carriages

Queensland
99 steel carriages
35 stainless steel carriages
112 suburban stainless steel carriages (SX)

Trams and light rail

New South Wales
100 R1 class Sydney trams

Victoria 
230 Z class Melbourne trams
70 A class Melbourne trams
132 B class Melbourne trams

Hong Kong 
70 MTR Phase I Light Rail Vehicles 1988

References

External links

Engineering companies of Australia
Defunct locomotive manufacturers of Australia
Defunct rolling stock manufacturers of Australia
Australian companies established in 1921
Australian companies disestablished in 1990
Vehicle manufacturing companies established in 1921
Vehicle manufacturing companies disestablished in 1990